Ashland School District is the school district in Ashland County, Wisconsin. The current enrollment is 2257 in grades K-12. The superintendent is Ken Kasinski.

Schools
Ashland School District has five schools:

Ashland High School
Enrollment: 772
Staff: 99
Brian Tretin, Principal

Ashland Middle School

Enrollment: 492
Staff: 78
Tom Gaudreau, Principal

Lake Superior Intermediate
Enrollment: 413
Staff: 63
John Esposito, Principal

Lake Superior Primary
Enrollment: 388
Staff: 63
Christopher Graff, Principal

Marengo Valley
Enrollment: 165
Staff: 28
Barb O'Brien, Principal

External links
Ashland School District website

School districts in Wisconsin
Education in Ashland County, Wisconsin